Tahoe is a bus rapid transit station on the Mississauga Transitway in Mississauga, Ontario, Canada. It is located along the east side of Eastgate Parkway on the south side of Tahoe Boulevard.

Tahoe and Etobicoke Creek opened on 16 February 2016.

References

External links
flickr search for: Mississauga Transitway Tahoe

Mississauga Transitway
2016 establishments in Ontario